Nevzat is a Turkish given name for males. People named Nevzat include:

Nevzat Ayaz (born 1930), Turkish civil servant and politician
Nevzat Halili (born 1946), Macedonian politician and teacher
Nevzat Sayin (born 1954), Turkish architect
Nevzat Soguk, Turkish professor of political science
Nevzat Tandoğan (1894–1946), Turkish civil servant and politician
Nevzat Tarhan (born 1952), Turkish medical scientist, psychiatrist and neuropsychology expert

Turkish masculine given names